The Emperor's Babe is a verse novel written by British author Bernardine Evaristo. Published by Penguin in 2001, it is Evaristo's second work of fiction. Based in London around 1800 years ago, it follows the story of black Nubian teenage girl, Zuleika, who comes of age in the Roman period. The Emperor's Babe won the Arts Council Writers Award in 2000, a NESTA Fellowship Award in 2003 and was chosen by The Times as one of the 100 Best Books of the Decade in 2010. In 2013, it was also adapted into a BBC Radio 4 play.

Reception

Reviews 
The Bookseller described The Emperor's Babe as "something completely different: a fresh and original historical novel, narrated in verse".  The Guardian also praised the form of the verse-novel and called it "adventurous, compelling and utterly original. You won’t read another book like it this year."

Honours and awards 

 2013: The Times 100 Best Books of the Decade
 2003: NESTA Fellowship Award for The Emperor's Babe
 2000: The Arts Council of England Writers Award
 Sunday Times Pick of the Week and Book of the Year
 Telegraph Book of the Year
 Sunday Independent Book of the Year
 Ireland Sunday Independent Book of the Year
 Red Magazine Pick of the Paperbacks
 Times Best of Summer Books

Bibliography 
 The Emperor's Babe (Hamish Hamilton/Penguin, 2001; Penguin USA, 2002)

References 

2001 British novels
Novels by Bernardine Evaristo
Verse novels
Novels set in London
Novels set in Roman Britain
British poems
Historical poems
English-language poems
Hamish Hamilton books